Cymatia is a genus of water boatmen in the family Corixidae. There are about six described species in Cymatia.

Species
These six species belong to the genus Cymatia:
 Cymatia americana Hussey, 1920
 Cymatia apparens (Distant, 1911)
 Cymatia bonsdorffi (Sahlberg, 1819)
 Cymatia coleoptera (Fabricius, 1777)
 Cymatia coleoptrata (Fabricius, 1777)
 Cymatia rogenhoferi (Fieber, 1848)

References

Further reading

 

Corixidae
Nepomorpha genera
Articles created by Qbugbot